Madge Oliver (18 September 1875 – 11 September 1924) was a British artist who painted interiors and landscapes and lived and worked in France for many years.

Biography
Oliver was born in Knaresborough in Yorkshire and studied at the Slade School of Art in London  from 1894 to 1897. Oliver won a Slade scholarship in 1896 with the other winner that year being Augustus John. Oliver moved to France in 1910 and settled in Cassis near Marseilles. She was decorated for her service during World War One.

Oliver mainly painted interiors but also figures and landscapes, mainly of France. She had a solo exhibition in Paris at the Druet Gallery in 1924. Oliver died on Corsica and a memorial exhibition, with a catalogue introduction written by Ethel Walker, for her was held at the Leger Galleries in London during June and July 1935. The Tate acquired two paintings by Oliver, both showing views from her studio in Cassis, from the 1935 exhibition.

References

External links

1875 births
1924 deaths
20th-century English women artists
20th-century English painters
Alumni of the Slade School of Fine Art
Artists from Yorkshire
English women painters
People from Knaresborough